Michael O'Connor (born 1930) is an Irish retired hurler who played as a right wing-back for club side Cappoquin and at inter-county level with the Waterford senior hurling team.

Honours

Ballygunner
Waterford Junior Hurling Championship (1): 1948

Waterford
All-Ireland Senior Hurling Championship (1): 1959
Munster Senior Hurling Championship (2): 1957, 1959
All-Ireland Minor Hurling Championship (1): 1948
Munster Minor Hurling Championship (1): 1948

References

1930 births
Living people
Waterford inter-county hurlers